Teatr na drodze (English: Performance on the Road) is the fourth studio album by Polish group 2 Plus 1, released in 1978 by Polskie Nagrania Muza. The LP included one of the band's greatest hits, "Windą do nieba", as well as duet with Czesław Niemen, "Ballada łomżyńska". In 2001 the album was reissued in CD format.

Track listing 
Side A:
 "Ding-dong" ("Free Me")
 "Windą do nieba" ("A Lift to Heaven")
 "California mon amour"
 "Dokąd idziesz, kochanie" ("Where Are You Going, Dear")
 "U nas już po burzy" ("It's All Over")

Side B:
 "Romanse za grosz" ("Two Penny Romance")
 "Podobny do ludzi" ("Similar to Others")
 "Teatr na drodze" ("Performance on the Road")
 "Ballada łomżyńska" ("The Ballad from Łomża")
 "O leli lo!"
 "Komu w oczach słońce" ("To Whom the Sun Beams")

Personnel
Elżbieta Dmoch: Vocals, Flute
Janusz Kruk: Vocals, Guitars, Piano
Zbigniew Hołdys: Guitars
Janusz Koman: Fender Rhodes
Czesław Niemen: Synthi EMS, Moog Piano, Vocals
Cezary Szlązak: Mellotron, Saxophone, Vocals
Andrzej Pawlik: Bass
Wacław Laskowski: Drums
Józef Gawrych: Percussion

External links 
 Teatr na drodze on Discogs

References 

1978 albums
2 Plus 1 albums
Polish-language albums